The Dream is a poem written by Lord Byron in 1816. It has been described as expressing "central Romantic beliefs about dreams". It also describes the view from the Misk Hills, close to Byron's ancestral home in Newstead, Nottinghamshire. Mary Chaworth of Annesley Hall, a distant relation for whom Byron had a boyhood passion, is the "Maid" of the poem.

Notes

Poetry by Lord Byron
1816 poems